Drog may refer to:
 Drog (anchor), a kind of anchor consisting of simply a canvas bag
 DROG Records, a Canadian record label
 Didier Drogba, Ivorian footballer
 "Drogs", nickname for supporters and fans of Drogheda United FC